Maas, MAAS or MaaS may refer to:

People
 Maas (surname), including a list of people with the name
 Maas Thajoon Akbar (1880–1944), a Ceylonese judge and lawyer 
 Thomas Samuel Swartwout (nicknamed Maas; 1660–1723), one of the earliest settlers of the Delaware River Valley

Places
 Maas, Syria
 Maghas, or Maas, the capital of Alania, a medieval kingdom in the Greater Caucasus
 Meuse, or Maas, a river in the Low Countries and France

Other uses
 Museum of Applied Arts & Sciences, in Sydney, Australia, incorporating the Powerhouse Museum, Sydney Observatory and the Museums Discovery Centre
 Mobility as a service (MaaS), a shift from personally-owned transport to mobility consumed as a service
 Mobility as a service (phones and tablets)
 Monitoring as a service (MaaS), a cloud computing delivery model

 MAAS, a bare-metal server provisioning tool from Canonical

See also
 
 Mass (disambiguation)
 Maes (disambiguation)
 Maass, a German surname
 Mace (surname)